Sunwar the Dead is an album by neoclassical band Elend. It is the second album in the Winds Cycle.

Track listing
"Chaomphalos" — 4:24
"Ardour" — 5:10
"Sunwar the Dead" — 4:31
"Ares in Their Eyes" — 6:02
"The Hemlock Sea" — 5:40
"La terre n'aime pas le sang" — 5:00
"A Song of Ashes" — 6:34
"Laceration" — 5:04
"Poliorketika" — 4:32
"Blood and Grey Skies Entwined" — 6:00
"Threnos" — 6:00

Musicians

Vocals

Solo soprano: Esteri Rémond
Female choir: Camille Balarie, Louise Legendre, Julia Michaelis, Chloé Nadeau, Esteri Rémond, Séverine Ronsard, Anna Maria Sarasto, Karine Sylvain

Strings

Solo violin, first violin, solo viola, conductor: David Kempf

Violins

First violins: Ismaël Guy, Inga Larusdottir, Elsa Saulnier
Second violins: Sylvain Daumard, Hélène Hector, Sébastien Thaumon
Third violins: Émilie Dunand, Étienne Philibert, Isabelle Robel

Violas

First violas: Shinji Chihara, David Choreman, Mathieu Hilbert
Second violas: Sandra Cardon, Judith Thomas, Emma Urbanek
Third violas: Julie Corda, Alexandre Grimaud, Anne Tigier

Cellos

First cellos: Vincent Catulescu, Catherine Fiolka
Second cellos: Anne Fournier, Benjamin Rabenau
Third cellos: Christian Dourinat, Éléonore Toinon

Basses

Basses: Raymond Lebars, Yves Levignon, Arnaud Pioncet

Winds

Nay flutes: Nizar Attawi
Bass flute: Estelle Sandrard
Oboe: Vladimir Jamet
Bass clarinet: Michaël Hardy
Trumpet, French horn: Klaus Amann
French horns: Samir Husseini, Philippe Laumond
Clarinets: Camille Drillon, Samuel Gresch
Trombone: Arnaud Pasquier
Bass trombone: René Adam

Percussion

Timpani, Bass drums: Marc Bertaud
Bass drums, snare drum: Alexandre Clément
Cymbals, gongs, tam-tam: Paul Lantenot
Various bells, steel drums, windchimes: Pierre Mangin
Industrial devices: Simon Eberl

All other instruments (flutes, prepared piano, spinet and other keyboards, santur, percussion) and vocals, sound-design and programming by Iskandar Hasnawi, Sébastien Roland and Renaud Tschirner.

References
Sunwar the Dead at Elends discography page

2004 albums
Elend (band) albums